Emergency Heroes is a mission-based driving game developed by Ubisoft Reflections and Ubisoft Barcelona and published by Ubisoft.

Story
The story centres around Zach Harper a former cadet of the futuristic Emergency Heroes team, an emergency service that combines the roles of police, firefighter and Emergency medical services. Harper was forced to quit the program after his actions led to the alleged death of a fellow cadet. He is called back up by Captain Walters after the team is overwhelmed by a wave of disasters and criminals afflicting the city. Harper must navigate through the streets of the city of San Alto, putting out fires, rescuing trapped citizens, clearing wreckage and chasing down criminals.

Gameplay
The game takes the form of a driving game with the vehicles controlled using the Wii motion controls. As a first responder in the game, the player undertakes a series of missions, all of which a performed through racing through a location. Simple side activities are also scattered around the map.

Each mission requires a range of driving abilities utilising a specific vehicle. For example, the Rescue Buggies are centered on making jumps, while police missions are structured as car chases. There are 12 different variations of rescue vehicles in the game including; Police Pursuit, Police Road Clearance, Firefighter or Rescuer (the other 3 being criminal vehicles). The game also features a two player mode for two players.

Reception

Emergency Heroes was met with negative reception upon release, as GameRankings gave it a score of 45%, while Metacritic gave it 41 out of 100.

In their review, GameSpot gave the game a score of 2.5 out of ten calling it "Terrible". They were highly critical of the  "sterile city", "repetitive missions" and "inconsequential plot", and commented that neither the single player, described as a "slog through dull missions", or multiplayer were any good.

Eurogamer, giving the game a 5/10, said that the game's controls weren't too bad and that it might appeal to a "five year-old boy" but were critical of the graphics of the game, describing the environment as looking "like it belongs in a PSone game".

See also
Emergency Mayhem, another Wii-exclusive game released in the same year involving emergency vehicles

References

External links
 
 

2008 video games
Medical video games
Open-world video games
Ubisoft games
Vehicular combat games
Video games about firefighting
Video games about police officers
Video games developed in Spain
Video games developed in the United Kingdom
Video games set in the future
Wii-only games
Wii games
Wii Wheel games